John L. Junkins is a professor of aerospace engineering at Texas A&M University specializing in spacecraft navigation, guidance, dynamics and control.  He holds the Royce E. Wisenbaker Endowed Chair at Texas A&M University and also serves as the founding director of the Texas A&M University Institute for Advanced Study. On November 24, 2020, Junkins was announced as the interim president of Texas A&M starting January 2021.

Biography
Junkins was born in Oakman, Georgia on May 23, 1943. Junkins' professional history has seen him working in government (NASA), industry, and academia over a five decade career. His work has supported numerous spaceflight missions, including the final three Apollo missions, and his inventions have led to commercial products including navigation sensors for autonomous aerial refueling of aircraft, and for pointing navigation of spacecraft based on star pattern recognition.

Junkins was elected a member of the National Academy of Engineering in 1996 for contributions to flight mechanics and flexible vehicle control. He is also a member of the International Academy of Astronautics and an Honorary Fellow of the American Institute of Aeronautics and Astronautics.

Junkins became interim President of Texas A&M University on January 1, 2021.

Education
 1965 Bachelor of Science, Aerospace Engineering, Auburn University, Alabama
 1967 Master of Science, University of California, Los Angeles
 1969 Doctor of Philosophy, University of California, Los Angeles

Career chronology
 1970–1977, University of Virginia
 1978–1985, Virginia Polytechnic Institute and State University
 1985 – present, Texas A&M University

Awards and honors
 1983 Mechanics & Control of Flight Award, AIAA
 1987 Dirk Brouwer Award, AAS
 1988 J. Leland Atwood Award, AIAA
 1990 Pendray Aerospace Literature Award, AIAA
 1997 von Karman Lectureship in Astronautics Award, AIAA
 1999 Frank J. Malina Astronautics Medal, IAF
 2003 Tycho Brahe Award, ION
 2006 Aerospace Guidance, Navigation, and Control Award, AIAA
 2011 Life-Time Achievement Medal, ICCES  
 2019 Robert H. Goddard Astronautics Award, AIAA

Works

References

External links
 John L. Junkins' personal webpage

Living people
Texas A&M University faculty
Presidents of Texas A&M University
1943 births